Filippo Randazzo (18th century) was an Italian painter, active in Palermo.

References

18th-century Italian painters
Italian male painters
Italian Baroque painters
Painters from Palermo
Year of death missing
18th-century Italian male artists